The 2019 Indian general election was held in India between April and May 2019 to constitute the 17th Lok Sabha.

Candidates 
Major election candidates are:

Results

Assembly Segmentwise Leads

References 

2019 Indian general election
2019 Indian general election by state or union territory
Indian general elections in Goa
2010s in Goa